Escape Dangerous is a 1947 British drama film directed by Digby Smith. It was made as a supporting feature for release on the lower half of a double-bill.

Cast
 Beresford Egan as Dr. Belhomme  
 Marianne Stone as Jacqueline Fabre 
 Lily Lapidus as Mme. Angeline  
 Daphne Day as Blanche de Vigny  
 Peter Noble as Michel Fournier  
 Humberston Wright as Aristide Fabre  
 Ethel Edwards as Countess de Fournier  
 Charles Paton as Night Porter  
 Jack Faint as First Tribunal Judge  
 Cyril Conway as Paul Bonnet  
 Beth Ross as Marie

References

Bibliography
 Klossner, Michael. The Europe of 1500-1815 on Film and Television: A Worldwide Filmography of Over 2550 Works, 1895 Through 2000. McFarland & Company, 2002.

External links

1947 films
British drama films
1947 drama films
British black-and-white films
1940s English-language films
1940s British films